Philodryas aestiva is a species of snake of the family Colubridae. It is commonly known as the Brazilian green racer and the common green racer.

Geographic range
The snake is found in South America.

References 

Colubrids
Snakes of South America
Reptiles of Argentina
Reptiles of Bolivia
Reptiles of Brazil
Reptiles of Chile
Reptiles of Paraguay
Reptiles described in 1854
Taxa named by André Marie Constant Duméril
Taxa named by Gabriel Bibron
Taxa named by Auguste Duméril